Mpok Nori (born as Nuri Sarinuri; 10 August 1930 – 3 April 2015) was an Indonesian comedian and actress.

Career
She began her career as an actress along with her friend Hj. Muhammad Bokir (deceased).

Personal life
In 1946, she married. She would have six children. On 3 April 2015, she died in Pasar Rebo General Hospital, aged 84.

Filmography 
 Hantu Biang Kerok (2009)
 Get Married 2 (2009)
 Get Married 3 (2011)
 Pocong Mandi Goyang Pinggul (2011)
 Penganten Pocong (2012)
 Jeritan Danau Terlarang (2013)
 Sule Detektif Tokek (2013)
 Malam Suro di Rumah Darmo (2014)

References

External links

1930 births
2015 deaths
Actresses from Jakarta
Indonesian male comedians
Indonesian comedians